Max Steel: Endangered Species is a 2004 computer-animated science fiction action film based on the TV series and action figure line of the same name. It is the only Max Steel movie to share continuity with the TV series.

A sequel, titled Max Steel: Forces of Nature, was released in 2005.

Plot
In this movie, Psycho and Bio-Con join forces to transform humanity into mutants who will be ruled by them. At one point, Psycho betrays Bio-Con, making him be trapped by a Psycho-robot (who looks like a silver-colored Psycho) who later self-destructs so that Psycho can rule the world instead of "sharing" it. Max tracks down Psycho and fights him. After the fight, Psycho attacks Max and 'Berto while they're trying to turn off the machine. Max kicks Psycho into the air, landing him into his own mutating device, which explodes. At the end of the movie, Elementor, a clone of Bio-Con, awakens, later to be the villain of the second movie and the new villain of the toyline.

Cast
 Christian Campbell as Max Steel
 Brian Drummond as Psycho and the Psycho-bots
 Scott McNeil as Bio-Constrictor (Bio-Con)
 Alessandro Juliani as 'Berto
 Meghan Black as Kat
 Nigel Mickelson as Elementor (in developing form)

Action figures
Max Steel: Endangered Species marks the last appearances of Psycho and Bio-Con, along with the last time that figures of them are made (excluding future Psycho-bot figures). The last Psycho figures were a silver repaint of the first Psycho figure that represents the Psycho-robot, and another Psycho with the same mold of the original Psycho, but has a different bionic arm: Instead of the original Psycho which had a claw arm, this one has a poseable arm, like that of the explosion face Psycho figure. He also comes with a gun. The last Bio-Con figures were two copper repaints of the Bio-Con figures (Bio-Con's skin changes to copper color in some scenes of the movie). One copper Bio-Con has a similar build to the original Bio-Con figure, however, his arms are cobras (something that happens in the movie). The other is a repaint of the "Super-Spit" figure, with the same mold, just painted copper.

External links
 Official site
 

2004 direct-to-video films
2004 animated films
Canadian direct-to-video films
American direct-to-video films
American animated science fiction films
Direct-to-video animated films
Films based on television series
Max Steel
Rainmaker Studios films
Films based on Mattel toys
2000s American animated films
2004 films
2000s English-language films
2000s Canadian films